Muhammad Saeed Noori is an Indian Sunni leader, activist, founder and president of the Raza Academy, based in Mumbai. The Raza Academy has published books, treatises and journal articles. He has also done relief and charitable activities during Gujarat Riots, Bareilly riots, Kashmir flood, Nepal earthquake and in Kerala 2018 Flood. He has organised rallies and protests on various issues around the country through Raza Academy.

Career
On the order of Sunni Barelvi leader Mustafa Raza Khan Qadri, Noori established Raza Academy with the help of other Muslims to carry forward the mission of Ahmed Raza Khan Barelvi. The Academy is considered as prominent voice of Indian Muslims.

RazaAcademy
Raza Academy is an organization of Indian Sufi Muslims that promotes Islamic beliefs through publications and research. The organization publishes Sunni literature concerned with the thought-school of Ahmed Raza Khan Barelvi. The organization is located in Mumbai, and Muhammad Saeed Noori is its founding secretary. It also works as advocacy group for Indian Muslims and has organised protests on several issues at all India level. An important meeting of Raza Academy was held at Sunni Bilal Masjid, Chhota Sonapur on Thursday regarding the (Eid Milad-un-Nabi) procession.  In which Maulana Moinuddin Ashraf, President of All India Sunni Jamiat Ulema and President of Raza Academy Alhaj Muhammad Saeed Noori also participated.

History
The Raza Academy was formed in 1978 by Alhaj Mohammed Saeed Noori. Mr. Noori has been the President of Raza Academy from 1986. The Academy was established to publish books of Sunni scholars specially of Imam-e-Ahmed Raza Khan Qadri and others. The Academy has published several hundred books of various Islamic subjects written by scholars in Urdu, Arabic, Hindi and In English.
According to a report, It maintains a web portal from as early as 1998 that includes directories of associated institutions and ulema.

Relief work
He has done relief work in number of states. 
He does charity work throughout the country. He visited Nepal to help earthquake victims. 
He formed the Sunni Relief Committee in association with All India Sunni Jamiat ul Ulema to distribute relief materials, collected from various parts of West Bengal and Maharashtra among the riot victims in Assam.

He distributed relief during a riot in Bhiwandi in 1984 worth rupees 150 lacs.

See also
Ahmed Raza Khan Barelvi
Arshadul Qaudri
Ahmad Saeed Kazmi
Hamid Raza Khan
Obaidullah Khan Azmi

References

External links
Home page

Barelvis
Living people
Year of birth missing (living people)
Indian publishers (people)